Mildred Brown "Brownie" Schrumpf (January 24, 1903 – March 2, 2001) was an American home economist, food educator, and author. Named the "Unofficial Ambassador of Good Eating" by the Maine Department of Agriculture, she wrote a weekly food column for the Bangor Daily News from 1951 to 1994 promoting traditional Maine recipes. She was the main proponent of the claim that the chocolate brownie was invented in Bangor. She was inducted into the Maine Women's Hall of Fame in 1997.

Early life and education

She was born Mildred Greely Brown on a farm in Readfield Depot, Maine, to Fred Brown and Nellie Mabel Gordon Brown. She was a member of the Kennebec County 4-H club and won a canning contest in her teens. After graduating from Winthrop High School in 1921, she attended the University of Maine – the first person in her family to go to college – and earned a bachelor's degree in home economics in 1925.

Career
She began her career as a tester for home gas stoves for the Bangor Gas Company. She next worked as an assistant leader in 4-H clubs statewide and as the Penobscot County 4-H club agent through the 1930s, updating home demonstrators on "food preservation, kitchen design and farm life". In the 1940s she worked for the United States Department of Agriculture Extension Service, giving demonstrations and classes and also teaching "camp cookery to forestry students". She also taught home economics classes at the University of Maine.

In the 1950s and 1960s she became the Maine Food Products Promoter for the Maine Department of Agriculture, and also did cooking demonstrations on television.

Food columnist

Schrumpf began writing a weekly food column called "Brownie's Kitchen" for the Bangor Daily News on August 31, 1951. Each column opened with remembrances of life in 20th-century Maine and featured traditional recipes using simple ingredients that could be found in any Maine grocery. Although she initially eschewed the use of ready-made ingredients, Schrumpf later printed recipes using convenience foods, which were included in her second cookbook collection, Memories from Brownie's Kitchen (1989). She continued producing her column until April 4, 1994.

"Bangor Brownies"

Schrumpf received widespread publicity for her claim that the chocolate brownie was invented in Bangor, Maine. In its first edition (2007), The Oxford Companion to American Food and Drink refuted her premise that "Bangor housewives" had created the brownie. The Oxford Companion noted that while Schrumpf cited the inclusion of the recipe in the Girl's Welfare Cook Book published in Bangor in 1912 as proof of the brownie's origins, a Fannie Farmer cookbook published in 1905 already contained a recipe for the chewy chocolate treat. However, in its second edition (2013), The Oxford Encyclopedia of Food and Drink in America said it had discovered evidence to support Schrumpf's claim, in the form of several 1904 cookbooks that listed a recipe for "Bangor Brownies".

Other activities
Schrumpf served as a judge for the Bangor State Fair and the national Pillsbury Bake-Off. She chaired the Maine Boiler Festival Chicken Barbecues and Luncheons, and headed delegations of Maine food demonstrators to the Eastern States Exposition in West Springfield, Massachusetts.

She maintained a lifelong association with the University of Maine and its alumni association, serving as class secretary for 40 years. She provided many artifacts for the "Brownie's Kitchen" exhibit, a replica of an early 20th-century farmhouse kitchen, at the Page Farm & Home Museum on the university campus.

Honors and awards
The University of Maine alumni association awarded her its Black Bear Award in 1957 and Pine Tree Alumni Service Emblem in 1974. She was named Woman of the Year by the Maine Press, Radio and TV Women in 1968 and "Unofficial Ambassador of Good Eating" by the Maine Department of Agriculture in 1970. She received a Kiwanis Recognition in Service Award from the Orono-Old Town Kiwanis chapter in 1976 and an Achievement Citation Award from the Maine chapter of the American Association of University Women in 1989. She was inducted into the Maine Women's Hall of Fame in 1997.

Personal
Known for her lively and energetic personality, she was always happy to answer cooking questions and share recipe advice. As she advanced in years, her birthday celebrations were well-attended affairs that were said to "require traffic control"; for one "birthday bash", a 20-person committee coordinated the event.

She married William E. Schrumpf, an agricultural economist at the University of Maine Agricultural Experimental Station, in 1932; he predeceased her in 1976. In her final years, she resided in a nursing home in Orono, where she died on March 2, 2001, at the age of 98.

The Brownie and William E. Schrumpf Papers, including her extensive collection of Maine community cookbooks and recipe pamphlets, are housed in the special collections department of the Raymond H. Fogler Library at the University of Maine.

Works

Notes

References

Sources

Further reading
 

Writers from Maine
American cookbook writers
Women cookbook writers
Women food writers
American columnists
American women columnists
University of Maine alumni
1903 births
2001 deaths
People from Readfield, Maine
People from Orono, Maine